The Hazemeyer gun mount was a stabilized naval gun mount for the Bofors 40 mm anti-aircraft gun, used during World War II by the Royal Navy. It was eventually replaced by the STAAG gun mount.

Development 
Manufactured by the Dutch Hazemeyer Company, the mount provided an alternative to the QF 2-pounder naval gun, as it was designed so that one set of layers aimed the gun, while a second manually stabilized the platform the gun sat on. The mount was self-contained and stabilized. The Dutch Hazemeyer Company was a subsidiary of the German company Siemens & Halske. The mount gained a reputation for unreliability among many naval officers.

See also 
Design 1047 battlecruiser

References 

Naval guns of the United Kingdom
World War II anti-aircraft guns
Naval anti-aircraft guns
World War II naval weapons
World War II naval weapons of the United Kingdom
40 mm artillery